Lee Jongseok is a South Korean judge. He was named a Justice of the Constitutional Court of Korea in 2018.

Career 
1989  Judge, Incheon District Court
1991  Judge, Seoul Civil District Court
1993  Judge, Daegu District Court Gyeongju Branch
1996  Judge, Seoul District Court Southern Branch
1997  Judge, Seoul High Court
2000  Judge, Seoul District Court
2001  Presiding Judge, Daegu District Court
2003  Presiding Judge, Suwon District Court 
2006  Presiding Judge, Seoul Central District Court
2007  Presiding Judge, Daejeon High Court
2009  Chief Presiding Judge, Suwon District Court
2010  Presiding Judge, Seoul High Court
2012  Chief Presiding Judge, Bankruptcy Chamber, Seoul Central District Court
2014  Presiding Judge, Seoul High Court
2015  Chief Presiding Judge, Seoul High Court
2016  Chief Judge, Suwon District Court
2018  Chief Presiding Judge, Seoul High Court
2018~ Justice of the Constitutional Court of Korea (since Oct. 18, 2018)

References 

1961 births
Living people
Justices of the Constitutional Court of Korea
South Korean judges
Seoul National University School of Law alumni